Kudumba Sangili is a 1999 Tamil language film directed by P. N. Ramachandar. The film stars the producer Kalaipuli G. Sekaran alongside Khushbu, while Manivannan plays a supporting role. The film, which had music composed by Sirpy, opened in November 1999.

Cast
Kalaipuli G. Sekaran
Khushbu
Alex
Rajesh
Nithya Ravindran
Vadivukkarasi
Bayilvan Ranganathan
Senthil

Soundtrack

Release
Post-release, the film was exempted from paying entertainment tax for four weeks.

References

1999 films
1990s Tamil-language films